Not Quite a Lady is a 1928 British silent comedy film directed by Thomas Bentley and starring Mabel Poulton, Janet Alexander and Barbara Gott. The screenplay concerns a wealthy woman who, unhappy with her son's choice of fiancée, holds a boring house party to try to put her off marrying into the family.

Cast
 Mabel Poulton - Ethel Borridge
 Janet Alexander - Mrs.Cassilis
 Barbara Gott - Mrs. Borridge
 Maurice Braddell - Geoffrey Cassilis
 Dorothy Bartlam - Mabel Marchmont
 George Bellamy - Maj. Warrington
 Gibb McLaughlin - The Vicar
 Sam Wilkinson - Mr. Borridge

References

External links

1928 films
Films shot at British International Pictures Studios
1920s English-language films
Films directed by Thomas Bentley
1928 comedy films
British comedy films
British silent feature films
Films set in England
British black-and-white films
Silent comedy films
1920s British films